Karl Otto Thaning (born May 9, 1977) is a South African actor and former professional swimmer and water polo player. As a swimmer he most notably competed in the 2004 Summer Olympics in Athens. As an actor, he has appeared in a number of films and television series.

Early life
Thaning attended the Bishops High School in Cape Town then, the University of the Pacific in Stockton, California, graduating with a degree in theatre and film.

Athletic career
Thaning represented his country in two sports, playing water polo for South Africa at the Heliopolis Tournament in Cairo, Egypt in 2003, and later for swimming at numerous tournaments.

As a swimmer, Thaning specialized in freestyle events. He claimed numerous short-course South African titles in sprint freestyle (both 50 and 100).

Thaning competed in the men's 4 × 100 m medley relay, as a member of the South African team, at the 2004 Summer Olympics in Athens., teaming with Gerhard Zandberg, Terence Parkin, and Eugene Botes in heat two, Thaning anchored a freestyle leg to finish the race with a split of 49.25, with the team finishing thirteenth overall in a final time of 3:43.94.

He captained the National Aquatic Team at the Commonwealth Games in Melbourne, Australia in 2006, during which he finished 9th in the 50 meter freestyle and anchored the freestyle leg of the men's 4 × 100 m medley relay to a 6th-place finish.

Acting career
Thaning began acting in 2002, and has appeared in numerous television shows and films since then. He played Captain Phillip Brooks in the seven-part 2008 South African miniseries Feast of the Uninvited. He also acted in international films, such as the 2010 Winnie, which starred Jennifer Hudson, and the 2012 film Dredd, in which he played Judge Chan.  Other characters portrayed by him include O'Malley in Black Sails, Jared Taylor in SAF3 and First Mate Warren in Outlander.

References

External links

Profile – South Africa Talent Agency
TVSA Actors' Profile

1977 births
Living people
South African male swimmers
South African male actors
Olympic swimmers of South Africa
Swimmers at the 2004 Summer Olympics
South African male freestyle swimmers
Sportspeople from Cape Town